The 1926–27 Notre Dame Fighting Irish men's basketball team represented the University of Notre Dame during the 1926–27 NCAA men's basketball season in the United States. The head coach was George Keogan, coaching in his fourth season with the Fighting Irish. The team finished the season with a 19–1 record and were named national champions by the Helms Athletic Foundation. Captain John Nyikos was named a consensus All-American at the end of the season as well.

Schedule and results

|-
!colspan=9 style="background:#002649; color:#CC9933;"| Regular season

Source

References

Notre Dame Fighting Irish men's basketball seasons
Notre Dame
NCAA Division I men's basketball tournament championship seasons
Notre Dame Fighting Irish Men's Basketball Team
Notre Dame Fighting Irish Men's Basketball Team